Francisco Javier Mulero Villena (born 17 August 1966) is a Spanish retired footballer who played as a centre back. He began his career with Barcelona, but never played for the first team. He went on to make 156 appearances in La Liga over six seasons for Real Burgos, Real Mallorca and Compostela, scoring four goals.

Career

Villena was born in Barcelona, capital of the autonomous community of Catalonia, and began his career with local giants FC Barcelona. He made his first appearances for the C team, Barcelona Amateur, during the 1985–86 season, in which they were relegated from Segunda División B. However, he was a key part of the side that won promotion at the first attempt the following year as winners of their Tercera División group. In 1987–88 he began playing for the B team, Barcelona Atlètic, in the Segunda División, with whom he also suffered relegation in 1988–89. He was never included in the first team squad, and left Barcelona in 1990 to join newly promoted La Liga side Real Burgos.

Villena made his top flight debut on 2 September in the first match of the season, as Burgos hosted Cádiz at Estadio El Plantío. He played the full 90 minutes as the hosts ran out 1–0 winners. After just one season with Burgos, he joined top division rivals Real Mallorca ahead of the 1991–92, at the end of which they were relegated. He continued to play with Mallorca for a further two seasons in the Segunda División, before returning to La Liga with newly promoted Compostela in 1994. He played for Compostela throughout their four-year stay in the top flight, before they were relegated in 1997–98 after losing a playoff.

Villena stayed with Compostela in the second tier for another two seasons, and then joined Gimnàstic de Tarragona in Segunda División B in 2000. He helped Nàstic earn promotion in what turned out to be his only season at the club, before retiring in 2001 as he approached his 35th birthday.

Honours
Barcelona Amateur
Tercera División: 1986–87

Career statistics

1. Appearance in the 1992–93 Segunda División promotion playoff
2. Appearances in the 1997–98 La Liga relegation playoff

References

External links

1966 births
Living people
Footballers from Barcelona
Spanish footballers
Association football defenders
La Liga players
Segunda División players
Segunda División B players
Tercera División players
FC Barcelona C players
FC Barcelona Atlètic players
Real Burgos CF footballers
RCD Mallorca players
SD Compostela footballers
Gimnàstic de Tarragona footballers